is a Japanese Olympic champion and three-time Olympic medalist snowboarder and Olympic skateboarder. He won the silver medal in the superpipe in 2013 Winter X Games XVII at the age of 14, becoming the youngest medalist in X Games history, and won silver medals in the half-pipe at both the 2014 Winter Olympics in Sochi and the 2018 Winter Olympics in Pyeongchang and the gold medal at the 2022 Winter Olympics in Beijing. He also competed at the 2020 Summer Olympics in Tokyo as a skateboarder, becoming the only athlete, who participated in all of the three consecutive Olympic Games in East Asia between 2018 and 2022.

Early life
Ayumu Hirano was born and raised in a small coastal city called Murakami in Niigata Prefecture, situated in a rather snowy area in Japan. His mother named him Ayumu (歩夢), which means "walk the dream" (歩＝walk, 夢＝dream), wishing him to become a person who would know the joy of pursuing a dream and the perseverance to make it come true. His father, Hidenori, was a surfer who eventually opened a surf shop and later made a skate park (Nihonkai Skate Park) from scratch in his hometown of Murakami. The father originally hoped for his son, Ayumu, to become a surfer, but the son did not like it much. Instead, he got absorbed in skateboarding, following in the footstep of his 3-year-older brother, Eiju. He started skateboarding at the age of 4 and then snowboarding half a year later. He said he did not even remember how he started as he was too young, and it was just so natural for him. He belonged to the skateboarding team "e-Yume Kids" (meaning team "great dream kids") at Nihonkai Skate Park and joined skateboarding competitions. As there was not a halfpipe near their hometown, his father often had to drive Hirano to Yokone ski resort in Yamagata Prefecture, where there was the first official permanent halfpipe in Japan, which, however, is 4 meters narrower than the world standard halfpipe. Burton, one of the leading snowboarding brands, has been sponsoring Hirano since he was a fourth-grader.

Career
Hirano's first big international snowboarding success was in March 2011, when he won the Burton US Junior Open. At the age of 12, the sixth-grader was not officially allowed to enter the open division of the event, where his mentor Kazuhiro Kokubo would win gold, and his brother Eiju would take the 7th place. However, he dropped into the pipe between rounds as a "poacher" and amazed the audience. In 2012, he was invited to the Burton High Fives, an open event held in New Zealand to win the gold at the age of 13. In 2013, he was invited to compete in the Winter X Games in Aspen, Colorado, snowboarding's biggest non-Olympic stage, where he won silver in the halfpipe behind Shaun White, who explained: "The Japanese rider who got second is 14 years old. It's amazing!" He continued with a first place at the Burton European Open, a second place at the Burton US Open (also behind Shaun White), and a third place at the Oakley Arctic Challenge, becoming the 2012/2013 Halfpipe World Tour Champion. With this, he became the youngest rider to achieve this title. In the 2014 Winter Olympics at Sochi, he won the silver, behind Switzerland's Iouri Podladtchikov.

In 2018, Hirano became the first Japanese snowboarder who won at Winter X Games Aspen after landing the first-ever back-to-back double cork 1440s in Halfpipe history.

Hirano again took the silver in the half pipe at the 2018 Winter Olympics in PyeongChang, with Shaun White of the U.S. taking the gold and Scotty James of Australia garnering the bronze.

Hirano competed in Men's Park Skateboarding at the 2020 Tokyo Olympics, placing 14th.

Hirano landed the first triple cork in halfpipe competition history at the 2021 Dew Tour at Copper Mountain.

Hirano won the halfpipe event at the 2022 Winter Olympics in Beijing after outrage sparked by controversial judging of his successful second run, where he only scored a 91 in an unprecedented performance that included landing a triple cork which had never been landed in Olympic competition; Hirano then repeated his exceptional performance in the third run, successfully landing the "too dangerous" triple cork again under greater public scrutiny of the judges, and winning the gold medal. Hirano became the first athlete to win gold for Japan in snowboarding at the Winter Olympics, as well as the first Japanese athlete to win Olympic medals for three winter games in a row.

Influences
Hirano's mentor, other than his parents, is Kazuhiro Kokubo, a Japanese two-time US Open winner in the halfpipe. Hirano said in an interview in 2013 with a Japanese magazine, Transworld Snowboarding Japan, "The environment has dramatically changed after I first went to the US. I met Kazu (Kokubo) and Carl (Harris), and it made it possible for me to join Mt. Hood summer camp and to compete in New Zealand. It gave me the experience in different pipes, and I got to see the leading riders ride. I came to understand what world-class means and knew what I needed to improve." Kokubo has been mentoring Hirano since 2011 and was assigned as the official technical coach for the Japanese national snowboarder team in 2013 by the Ski Association of Japan to support them in the 2012–2013 season.

Among Hirano's other coaches are Ben Boyd and Elijah Teter at Ski & Snowboard Club Vail.

Hirano's father has had the motto of "Personality comes first. The most essential is the most important" throughout his parenting and running his kids' skateboarding team.

Personal life
Ayumu's brother, Kaishu Hirano, is also a snowboarder.

References

External links
 
 
 
 
World Snowboard Tour profile
Profile at Rolling Stone

Living people
Japanese male snowboarders
Sportspeople from Niigata Prefecture
Snowboarders at the 2014 Winter Olympics
Snowboarders at the 2018 Winter Olympics
Snowboarders at the 2022 Winter Olympics
Olympic snowboarders of Japan
Medalists at the 2014 Winter Olympics
Medalists at the 2018 Winter Olympics
Medalists at the 2022 Winter Olympics
Olympic gold medalists for Japan
Olympic silver medalists for Japan
Olympic medalists in snowboarding
1998 births
X Games athletes
Skateboarders at the 2020 Summer Olympics
Japanese skateboarders
Olympic skateboarders of Japan
20th-century Japanese people
21st-century Japanese people